Frederik Gjinali (born 29 July 1942) is an Albanian former footballer who played as a defender. He is a one-club man, having spent his 9-year career at Dinamo Tirana, winning three championships and two Albanian Cups.

International career
Gjinali has also been a former Albania international, playing one match in 1967. He was part of squad that played in the qualifiers of UEFA Euro 1968. He made his competitive debut on 17 December 1967 in the preliminary round against West Germany where he had a goal disallowed for allegedly offside as the match finished in a goalless draw. Albania eventually finished last in Group 4.

International statistics

Honours
Albanian Superliga: 1
 1967, 1973, 1975

References

External links

1942 births
Living people
Footballers from Tirana
Albanian footballers
Association football defenders
Albania international footballers
FK Dinamo Tirana players
Kategoria Superiore players